The IWA Puerto Rico Heavyweight Championship ("Campeonato de Puerto Rico Peso Completo de la IWA" in Spanish), was a secondary championship defended in the International Wrestling Association of Puerto Rico (IWA-PR).

History 
Championship was announced on June 16, 2008 via IWA's website then on IWA's TV Show Impacto Total. The title was shown to the public on June 28, 2008 by IWA's Promoter Edwin Vázquez Ortega at Yabucoa, Puerto Rico then it was announced that the inaugural champion was going to be decided in a Tournament.

The inaugural tournament took place at three dates: On July 5, 2008 at San Juan, Puerto Rico then On July 12, 2008 at Bayamón, Puerto Rico and the final on the Summer Attitude live event on July 19, 2008 at Bayamon, Puerto Rico.

On September 6, 2008 at Armagedón show in Bayamón, the title changed hands in a Tag Team Match, where the IWA Hardcore Championship was also on the line. in the match El Bacano & Vengador Boricua defeated Zaeir Arafat (IWA-Hardcore) & Hardam Kadafi (IWA-PR) to win those titles respectly.

On October 4, 2008 at Golpe de Estado show the IWA Hardcore and IWA World Cruiserweight Championships were unified to this title and the new champion was Noel Rodríguez who defeated Zaer Arafat, Rick Stanley, Hardam Kadafi, Spectro, Manson, Rainstein, Onix and Niche in an Elimination Match.

On April 3, 2010 the championship was defended outside Puerto Rico for the first time when Q. T. Marshall defeated Ray Beez on I Believe in Wrestling live Event Believe XVI on Florida, United States.

On November 20, 2010, Triple Mega Champion Dennis Rivera was stripped of the title by IWA's president Miguel Pérez Jr. as he had not defended it in almost 2 months

Inaugural tournament

Title history

Combined reigns

References 

International Wrestling Association (Puerto Rico) championships
United States professional wrestling championships